There are 123 diplomatic missions in Hong Kong, of which 62 are consulates-general and 61 are consulates (including those represented by honorary consuls, denoted by ) and six officially recognised bodies in Hong Kong. As Hong Kong has the status of a Special Administrative Region of the People's Republic of China, some consuls-general in Hong Kong report directly to their respective foreign ministries, rather than to their Embassies in Beijing.

Most of the consulates-general are located in the areas of Central, Admiralty, Wan Chai, Wan Chai North, Causeway Bay and Sheung Wan within Victoria City. Only three are located in Kowloon or New Kowloon (Cambodia,  Nepal and Chile), in the areas of Tsim Sha Tsui, Tsim Sha Tsui East and Kowloon Bay respectively.

Of these, 55 consulates-general and seven honorary consulates are also accredited to Macau (denoted by ). There are 10 honorary consulates in Macau, of which two are subordinate to the consulates-general in Hong Kong.

Special status of Hong Kong
Hong Kong has the status of a Special Administrative Region of the People's Republic of China, and some consuls-general in Hong Kong have the rank of Ambassador, including: 
Brazil 
Japan 
Philippines 
United States

Other consuls-general have served elsewhere as Ambassadors or High Commissioners before serving in Hong Kong, for example:

Australia 
Germany
Israel

Thomas Gnocchi, the current Head of the Office of the European Union to Hong Kong and Macao, also serves as the Deputy Head of the EEAS Japan, Korea, Australia, New Zealand, and Pacific Division.

Another feature of some consuls-general in Hong Kong is that they report directly to their respective foreign ministries, rather than to their Embassies in Beijing, such as those of the following countries:

 Canada
 Israel
 South Korea
 United Kingdom
 United States

Various consulates general are accredited to both Hong Kong and Macau. The Philippines operates consulates in both territories, and Portugal serves Hong Kong through its Macau consulate. Several consulates serving both Hong Kong and Macau indicate both territories in their official names, while others do not. In 2018 the Ministry of Foreign Affairs of China requested that consulates indicate only one of the territories in their official names even if they serve both territories; it did not send this request to the European Union Office to Hong Kong and Macao.

History
When Hong Kong was under British rule, the Governor represented the British government, as well as the British monarch as head of state. Matters relating to British nationality were handled by the Hong Kong Immigration Department.

However, the United Kingdom's commercial interests were represented by the British Trade Commission. The last Senior Trade Commissioner, Francis Cornish, became the first British Consul-General following the transfer of sovereignty to China, on July 1, 1997.

During the negotiations between Britain and China on the future of Hong Kong, the British proposed the establishment of a "British Commissioner" following the transfer of sovereignty to China, which the Chinese rejected as an attempt to make the future Hong Kong Special Administrative Region into a member or associated member of the Commonwealth.

As Hong Kong was a Colony (later Dependent Territory) of a Commonwealth country, some Commonwealth countries were represented by Commissions before the handover including:
 
Australia 
Bangladesh
Canada 
New Zealand 
India 
Malaysia 
Nigeria
Singapore

After the transfer of sovereignty, they were renamed Consulates-General. Similarly, the title of the head of mission was also changed, from Commissioner to Consul-General. However, the Australian Commission had been renamed the Consulate-General in 1986.

Although South Africa rejoined the Commonwealth in 1994, and its Embassies in Commonwealth countries were renamed High Commissions, the name of the South African Consulate General in Hong Kong remained unchanged. Similarly, while Pakistan had rejoined the Commonwealth in 1989, the name of the Pakistan Consulate General in Hong Hong also remained unchanged.

At the time of the transfer of sovereignty on 1 July 1997, South Africa did not have diplomatic relations with the People's Republic of China, as it had not yet transferred recognition from Taiwan. However, it was able to maintain its Consulate-General for an interim six-month period, until relations with Beijing were established on 1 January 1998.

Other countries which had chosen to maintain diplomatic relations with Taipei closed their consulates in Hong Kong prior to the transfer of sovereignty, such as Paraguay, which closed its consulate on May 11, 1997. Earlier, it had considered relocating to Macau, which was then still under Portuguese administration. The Central African Republic, Costa Rica, and the Dominican Republic also closed their consulates, while Liberia, with which China had broken off diplomatic relations in September 1997, was forced to close its consulate a month later. However, it later restored diplomatic relations with Beijing in 2003.

As a result of the transfer of sovereignty, North Korea, which had not been allowed to establish a trade mission in Hong Kong during British rule, was able to open a Consulate-General in February 2000. Similarly, Iran was also able to re-establish its Consulate-General, giving rise to concerns that the country could gain access to arms smuggled through Hong Kong, a free port. This had been closed by the British Government in 1989 following the Rushdie Affair.

Bhutan, which did not have diplomatic relations with either Beijing or Taipei at the time of the transfer of sovereignty, was able to maintain an honorary consulate in Hong Kong, accredited to Macau.

Consular posts 

 – Consulate
 – Consulate General

 – Consulate General
 – Consulate General

 – Consulate
 – Consulate General
 – Consulate
 – Consulate General
 – Consulate General
 – Consulate
 – Consulate (Bhutan and the People's Republic of China have no diplomatic relations)
 – Consulate
 – Consulate General
 – Consulate General
 – Consulate

 – Consulate General
 – Consulate
 – Consulate General
 – Consulate General
 – Consulate General
 – Consulate
 – Consulate
 – Consulate
 – Consulate
 – Consulate General

 – Consulate General
 – Consulate

 – Consulate General
 – Consulate
 – Consulate
 – Consulate
 – Consulate

 – Consulate
 – Consulate General
 – Consulate General

 – Consulate General 
 – Consulate General
 – Consulate
 – Consulate

 – Consulate General

 – Consulate
 – Consulate General
 – Consulate General
 – Consulate General
 – Consulate General
 – Consulate General
 – Consulate General
 – Consulate

 – Consulate
 – Consulate General
 – Consulate

 – Consulate General
 – Consulate
 – Consulate General 
 – Consulate General
 – Consulate

 – Consulate General
 – Consulate
 – Consulate
 – Consulate
 – Consulate
 – Consulate

  – Consulate
 – Consulate General
 – Consulate
 – Consulate
 – Consulate
  – Consulate
 – Consulate General
  – Consulate
 – Consulate
 – Consulate General
 – Consulate
 – Consulate
 – Consulate General 

 – Consulate
 – Consulate General
 – Consulate General
 – Consulate General
  – Consulate
  – Consulate General
  – Consulate

 – Consulate

 – Consulate General
 – Consulate General
 – Consulate
 – Consulate General
 – Consulate General 
 – Consulate General
 – Consulate (subordinate to the Consulate General in Macau)

 – Consulate General

 – Consulate General
 – Consulate General
 – Consulate

 – Consulate
 – Consulate
 – Consulate General 
 – Consulate
 – Consulate General
 – Consulate
 – Honorary Consulate
 – Consulate General
 – Consulate General
 – Consulate
 – Consulate
 – Consulate
 – Consulate General
 – Consulate General

 – Consulate
 – Consulate General
 – Consulate
 – Consulate
 – Consulate
 – Consulate General

 – Consulate
 – Consulate General
 – Consulate-General
 – Consulate General
 – Consulate

 – Consulate General
 – Consulate General
 – Consulate General

 – Consulate 

 – Consulate General

†. Also accredited to Macau.
‡. Honorary Consulates.

Missions of recognised bodies 
 Bank for International Settlements – Representative Office for Asia and the Pacific
 European Union – Office of the European Commission 
 Hague Conference on Private International Law – Asia Pacific Regional Office
 The International Bank for Reconstruction and Development and The International Finance Corporation – IFC Regional Office for East Asia and Pacific and the World Bank Private Sector Development Office for East Asia and Pacific
 International Monetary Fund – Hong Kong SAR Sub-Office
 United Nations High Commissioner for Refugees –  Sub-Office

*. Also accredited to Macau.

Former missions 
 (Consulate-General until 2018)
 (Honorary Consulate until 2003)
 (Honorary Consulate until 2007)
 (Consulate-General until 2000)
 (Honorary Consulate until 2006)
 (Honorary Consulate until 2009)
 (Consulate-General until 2012).
 (Consulate-General until 2012).
 (Honorary Consulate until 2016)
 (Honorary Consulate until 2013)
 (Honorary Consulate until 2003)
 (Consulate-General until 2003, and Honorary Consulate until 2004, which was reopened in 2008) .
  
 (Consulate-General until 2003)
 (Consulate-General until 1975)
 (Consulate-General until 1975)
 (Honorary Consulate until 2014)
 (Honorary Consulate until 2007)
 (Consulate-General until 2002) 

The following countries, which recognise Taiwan as the Republic of China, previously had consulates in Hong Kong before 1997.

 
 
 
 
 
 
 

Paraguay is currently accredited to Hong Kong and Macau through its embassy in Tokyo, Japan. 

The following countries, which no longer have diplomatic relations with Taiwan, previously had consulates in Hong Kong under British rule:

Countries without missions
The following countries, which have diplomatic relations with the People's Republic of China, do not presently have representation in Hong Kong, but have proposed establishing consulates:

 
 
 

The following countries, which have diplomatic relations with Taiwan, have never had consulates in Hong Kong:

Relations with Mainland China 

The Liaison Office of the Central People's Government in the Hong Kong Special Administrative Region is the representative office of the central government of the People's Republic of China in Hong Kong. It was established in May 1947 as Xinhua News Agency and renamed on 18 January 2000.

Relations with Taiwan

The Taipei Economic and Cultural Office, previously named Chung Hwa Travel Service, is a de facto mission of the Republic of China in Hong Kong. The relationship between the two entities is managed through the Hong Kong-Taiwan Economic and Cultural Co-operation and Promotion Council (ECCPC) and Taiwan-Hong Kong Economic and Cultural Co-operation Council (ECCC).

See also 

 Hong Kong Economic and Trade Office
 Consular missions in Macau
 The Office of the Commissioner of the Ministry of Foreign Affairs of the People's Republic of China in the Hong Kong Special Administrative Region

References

External links 
 125 diplomatic missions in Hong Kong 
 Protocol Division Government Secretariat of the Government of the Hong Kong SAR

 
Diplomatic missions
Diplomatic missions
Hong Kong